This is a list of foreign ministers of the Republic of Artsakh.

1993–1997: Arkadi Ghukasyan
1997–2002: Naira Melkumyan
2002–2004: Ashot Gulyan
2004–2005: Arman Melikyan
2005–2011: Georgy Petrosyan
2011–2012: Vasily Atajanyan (acting)
2012–2017: Karen Mirzoyan
2017–2021: Masis Mayilyan
2021–2023: David Babayan
2023–present: Sergey Ghazaryan

See also
Foreign relations of Artsakh
List of Ministers of Foreign Affairs of Armenia

References

Sources
Rulers.org – Foreign ministers A–D

Foreign
Politicians